Laetiporus gilbertsonii is a species of polypore fungus in the family Fomitopsidaceae. It is found in western North America.  It was one of three new Laetiporus species published in 2001, which were distinguished genetically from the common Laetiporus sulphureus; the others were L. conifericola and L. huroniensis. The type collection, made in San Francisco's Golden Gate Park in 1997, was found fruiting on a eucalyptus tree. It has also been collected in Oregon and Washington. The fungus is named in honor of mycologist Robert Lee Gilbertson. L. gilbertsonii is edible, although some people have reported experiencing upset stomach after consuming it. Laetiporus conifericola is very similar in appearance, but is readily distinguished by its growth on conifers.

References

Edible fungi
Fungi described in 2001
Fungi of the United States
Fungal plant pathogens and diseases
gilbertsonii
Fungi without expected TNC conservation status